Kyangin is a town in the Ayeyarwady Division of south-west Myanmar. It is the seat of the Kyangin Township in the Hinthada District. The name Kyangin came from Kyant Kin. Kyant means crocodile in Mon language, and here Kin means guard for taxation on waterway.

Populated places in Ayeyarwady Region
Township capitals of Myanmar